A sugar melon is a type of cantaloupe that is about  in diameter and weighing between . Nearly round in shape, it has thick, sweet, orange flesh and a silvery gray, ribbed exterior.

References
 Ward, Artimas. The Grocer's Encyclopedia. New York: 1911. digital.lib.msu.edu

Melons